Ubell is a surname. Notable people with the surname include:

 Earl Ubell (1926–2007), American innovative science and health reporter
 Robert Ubell, former Vice Dean of Online Learning at New York University Tandon School of Engineering

Fictional
 Bill Ubell, a character in The Life Aquatic with Steve Zissou